The 2000 K League was the 18th season of K League.

Regular season

Championship playoffs

Bracket

Final table

Awards

Main awards

Best XI

Source:

See also
 2000 K League Championship
 2000 Korean League Cup
 2000 Korean League Cup (Supplementary Cup)
 2000 Korean FA Cup

References

External links
 RSSSF

K League seasons
1
South Korea
South Korea